Anita Ratnam (born 21 May 1954) is an Indian classical and contemporary dancer and choreographer. Classically trained in Bharat Natyam, she has also received formal training in Kathakali, Mohiniattam, and T'ai chi and Kalarippayattu, thus creating a dance style which she has coined "Neo Bharatam".

She is the founder-director of Arangham Trust, set up in 1992 in Chennai. She also founded Arangham Dance Theatre, a performance company in 1993 and in 2000 she created Narthaki.com, an Indian dance portal. Over the years, she has received numerous awards and recognition for her work in the performing arts in India and abroad as a choreographer, scholar and cultural activist.

Narthaki.com is a dance web portal founded by Dr. Anita R. Ratnam. In 1992 (with a second printed edition in 1997), it started as a phone book with 2000 addresses, when no such data base existed, not even the government had one. It was launched on the internet in April 2000. It has been described as India's first dance portal, and also its largest, and a forum for performing artists and connoisseurs of the arts. The portal publishes Reviews, Previews, Interviews, Profiles, Articles, research articles, special columns by noted scholars, health column, snippets of dance information that is used by researchers, details of programmes, contacts of performers, dance institutions, dance musicians, dance festivals, dance spaces etc, quotes, flash news, obits and a much awaited monthly newsletter.

Education and training
Anitha Rathnam had her initial dance training under Bharatanatyam guru, Adyar K. Lakshman and later went to Rukmini Devi Arundale's 'Kalakshetra' for advanced training and earned a Post graduate diploma in Dance. She trained in Bharatanatyam as well as Kathakali and Mohiniattam, the classical dances of Kerala.

Career

She did her MA in Theatre and Television from the University of New Orleans, and spent the next ten years as a Television Producer/commentator in the United States with productions including a weekly series on art, travel and culture in India. She set up Arangham Trust, set up in 1992 in Chennai, followed by Arangham Dance Theatre, a performance company in 1993.

A modernist, passionately convinced about creating from her immediate environment, Ratnam has explored various streams of movement and ritual traditions connected with her initial training in classical Bharatanatyam. 

Quoting about her inspiration and her works, she says:

"I am in dance because this is my own way of connecting with myself and the world.  I consider myself a contemporary classicist.

All my ideas are from traditional sources, but they can also be from readings and from nature: a lotus flower floating in a small brass vessel, a child blowing soap bubbles, even a piece of paper flying in the wind gives me inspiration.

The whole world of ideas and a host of people and their mannerisms can all be suggested by a flicker of an eyelid, a flourish of the hand and the attitude of the body. The ideas come from many sources but I use them and put them together in my own style of dance, movement and theatre techniques.

When people see my work, they can tell that it is Indian in spirit but very contemporary in approach.  Folk dancers and drummers who dance every evening after a hard day's work in the fields, traditional temple performers whose lives depend upon serving GOD during important festivals, actors who fuse movement with voice culture, young performers and students all over the world who want to learn new movement and the dynamics of cultural memories embedded into our South Asian bloodstream – these are the artistes who are the focus of my work.

I call myself a cultural activist because I believe in my culture. My culture doesn't mean just the performing arts. To me it stands for finding out about my roots and knowing who I am. And the classical arts are a very vital part of our culture.".

In 2007, she performed her solo operatic performance "7 Graces" at Joyce SoHo, New York in collaboration with Hari Krishnan, a Canada-based dancer-choreographer.

She has also appeared in some Tamil movies over the years, such as Kandukondain Kandukondain (2000) and Boys (2003).

Choreographies
 A Map to the Next World (1997), With Native American poet Joy Harjo
 Inner World (1998), ; with Pangea World Theatre in Minneapolis
 Daughters of the Ocean (1999), ; with writer Shobita Punja
 Dust (2002), with Mark Taylor of Dance Alloy, Pittsburgh, USA.
 Hyphenated (2002), for Toronto's Lata Pada.
 Seven Graces (2005), with Canada-based Hari Krishnan
 Vortext (2006), with Canadian dance artist Peter Chin
 MA3KA (2009).

Awards

Anita Ratnam has received several awards and recognition for her work in the performing arts in India and abroad. 
Some of them are:

Sangeet Natak Akademi Award (2016) by Sangeet Natak Akademi for contemporary dance  Nritya Choodamani(1996) by Sri Krishna Gana Sabha, Chennai   Kalaimamani (1998) for Dance Research by Govt. of Tamil NaduMedia Achievement award (1991) by National Organisation of women in New YorkMahatma Gandhi Award for Cultural Harmony (1986) US Lalithakalaratna  (2003) by Sri Lalithakala Academy Foundation Trust (Inc.),Mysore, 2003Natya Ratna  (2003) by Sri Shanmukhananda Sangeeta Sabha, New Delhi Vishwa Kala Ratna (2017) by National Indian Arts Awards (Milapfest), United Kingdom

References

External links

 
 Arangham Trust, website

Artists from Madurai
1954 births
Living people
Indian female classical dancers
University of New Orleans alumni
Indian women choreographers
Indian choreographers
Artists from Chennai
Performers of Indian classical dance
Kalakshetra Foundation alumni
20th-century Indian dancers
20th-century Indian women artists
Dancers from Tamil Nadu
Women artists from Tamil Nadu
21st-century Indian dancers
21st-century Indian women artists
Recipients of the Sangeet Natak Akademi Award